Events from the year 1961 in Canada.

Incumbents

Crown 
 Monarch – Elizabeth II

Federal government 
 Governor General – Georges Vanier
 Prime Minister – John Diefenbaker
 Chief Justice – Patrick Kerwin (Ontario)
 Parliament – 24th

Provincial governments

Lieutenant governors 
Lieutenant Governor of Alberta – John Percy Page
Lieutenant Governor of British Columbia – George Pearkes 
Lieutenant Governor of Manitoba – Errick Willis 
Lieutenant Governor of New Brunswick – Joseph Leonard O'Brien  
Lieutenant Governor of Newfoundland – Campbell Leonard Macpherson 
Lieutenant Governor of Nova Scotia – Edward Chester Plow 
Lieutenant Governor of Ontario – John Keiller MacKay 
Lieutenant Governor of Prince Edward Island – Frederick Walter Hyndman
Lieutenant Governor of Quebec – Onésime Gagnon (until October 12) then Paul Comtois 
Lieutenant Governor of Saskatchewan – Frank Lindsay Bastedo

Premiers 
Premier of Alberta – Ernest Manning
Premier of British Columbia – W.A.C. Bennett 
Premier of Manitoba – Dufferin Roblin  
Premier of New Brunswick – Louis Robichaud 
Premier of Newfoundland – Joey Smallwood 
Premier of Nova Scotia – Robert Stanfield 
Premier of Ontario – Leslie Frost (until November 8) then John Robarts 
Premier of Prince Edward Island – Walter Shaw 
Premier of Quebec – Jean Lesage  
Premier of Saskatchewan – Tommy Douglas (until November 7) then Woodrow Lloyd

Territorial governments

Commissioners 
 Commissioner of Yukon – Frederick Howard Collins 
 Commissioner of Northwest Territories – Robert Gordon Robertson

Events

January to June
 June 1 
 The Canadian Bank of Commerce and the Imperial Bank of Canada merge to form the Canadian Imperial Bank of Commerce.
 Census Day for the 1961 Census of Canada, which finds Canada has a population of 18,238,247.
 June 6 – CUSO is formed
 June 13 – The NCC study of Ottawa's new Green Belt is completed
 June 14 – James Elliott Coyne, the Governor of the Bank of Canada resigns due to disagreements with the federal government's fiscal policies

July to December
 August 3 – Tommy Douglas is elected leader of the newly formed New Democratic Party
 August 14 – 15 – The Premiers meet in Charlottetown
 August 26 – The new home for the Hockey Hall of Fame opens in Toronto, at the Canadian National Exhibition.
 October 1 – CTV, Canada's second major television network, begins broadcasting
 November 7 – Woodrow Lloyd becomes premier of Saskatchewan, replacing Tommy Douglas
 November 8 – John Robarts becomes premier of Ontario, replacing Leslie Frost
 November 17 – Saskatchewan passes a bill creating Canada's first government run health system
 December 28 – Canada's first BOMARC Missile squadron is formed

Full date unknown
 The Co-operative Commonwealth Federation becomes the New Democratic Party
 The Massey Lectures are created
 The transatlantic telephone system is officially launched with a call from Elizabeth II to Prime Minister John Diefenbaker.
 The Canadian Conference of the Arts is established.

Sport 
March 12 – The Trail Smoke Eaters win the 1961 Ice Hockey World Championships for Canada.
May 5 – The Ontario Hockey Association's Toronto St. Michael's Majors win their fourth (and final) Memorial Cup by defeating the Central Alberta Hockey League's Edmonton Oil Kings 4 games to 2. The deciding Game 6 was played at Edmonton Gardens.
July 11 – Gene Kiniski becomes the first Canadian to win the AWA World Heavyweight Championship by defeating Verne Gagne
December 2 – The Winnipeg Blue Bombers win their 6th Grey Cup by defeating the Hamilton Tiger-Cats  21–14  in the 49th Grey Cup at CNE Stadium in Toronto.

Arts and literature

New books
 Morley Callaghan: A Passion in Rome
 Max Aitken: Courage
 Margaret Atwood: Double Persephone
 Farley Mowat: Owls in the Family

Awards
 See 1961 Governor General's Awards for a complete list of winners and finalists for those awards.
 Stephen Leacock Award: Norman Ward, Mice in the Beer

Births

January to March

 January 11 – Graham Welbourn, swimmer
 January 15 - Yves Pelletier, film director and actor 
 January 18 – Mark Messier, ice hockey player
 January 26 – Wayne Gretzky, ice hockey player and coach
 January 27 – Tony Clement, politician and Minister
 January 28 – Normand Rochefort, ice hockey player and coach
 February 4 – Connor O'Brien, Canadian skier
 February 10 – Steve Pagendam, boxer
 February 21 – Paul Edwards, politician and lawyer
 February 23 – Silvia Ruegger, long-distance runner (died 2019)
 February 27 – Ann Peel, race walker
 February 28 - René Simard, singer
 March 16 – Todd McFarlane, cartoonist, comic book artist, writer, toy designer and entrepreneur
 March 24 – Pat Turner, rower and Olympic gold medallist

April to June
 April 6 – Gene Eugene, actor, record producer, engineer, composer and musician (died 2000)
 April 10 – Barb Tarbox, anti-smoking activist (died 2003)
 April 22 – Scott D. Sampson, paleontologist, science communicator and television presenter
 May 1 – Clint Malarchuk, ice hockey player
 May 8 – Greg Thomey, comedian
 May 9 – Darren Praznik, politician
 May 10 – Randy Cunneyworth, Canadian ice hockey player and coach
 June 1 – Paul Coffey, ice hockey player
 June 9 – Michael J. Fox, actor, author and voice over artist

July to September
 July 1 – Michelle Wright, singer-songwriter
 July 8 – Kelly Kryczka, synchronized swimmer
 July 17 – Blair Horn, rower and Olympic gold medallist
 July 23 
 André Ducharme, author, comedian and humorist
 Richard Martineau, journalist
 Rob Stewart, actor
 July 24 – Brian McMahon, coxswain and Olympic gold medallist
 July 26 – Alan Lowe, politician
 August 12 – Peter Szmidt, swimmer
 August 20 – Lizanne Bussières, long-distance runner
 August 23 – François Lapointe, racewalker
 August 25 – Dave Tippett, ice hockey player and coach
 September 12 – Mylène Farmer, singer, songwriter, actress and author
 September 16 – Jen Tolley, actress, voice actress and singer
 September 18 – Denis Lambert, boxer
 September 24 
 Nancy Garapick, swimmer and Olympic bronze medallist
 Luc Picard, actor 
 September 25 – Tracy Wilson, ice dancer
 September 27 – Randy Vancourt, composer and entertainer
 September 30 – Erica Ehm, video jockey, songwriter and actress

October to December

 October 16 - Pierre Karl Péladeau, president and CEO of Quebecor Inc., Quebecor Media Inc. and Sun Media Corporation
 October 25 – Alison Webb, judoka
 November 2 – k.d. lang, singer-songwriter
 November 23 – Floyd Roland, politician and 11th Premier of the Northwest Territories
 December 8 – André Bachand, politician
 December 10 – Mark McKoy, hurdler and Olympic gold medallist
 December 11 - Michel Courtemanche, actor
 December 13 – Ranza Clark, middle-distance runner
 December 18 – Brian Orser, figure skater, double Olympic silver medallist and World Champion
 December 30  
 Douglas Coupland, novelist
 Ben Johnson, Jamaica-born sprinter, double Olympic bronze medallist, Olympic gold medal rescinded as disqualified for doping

Deaths

January to June
 May 12 - Janis Babson (born 1950)
 May 14 – Albert Sévigny, politician (born 1881)
 May 28 – Frank Boyes, politician (born 1874)
 May 29 – Gilbert Layton, businessman and politician (born 1899)
 May 31 – Walter Little, politician (born 1877)
 June 6 – William Anderson, politician and businessman (born 1905)
 June 19 – Richard Ernest William Turner, soldier and recipient of the Victoria Cross (born 1871)

July to December

 July 12 – Mazo de la Roche, author (born 1879)
 July 15 – John Edward Brownlee, politician and 5th Premier of Alberta (born 1884)
 September 12 – Joseph-Arthur Bradette, politician (born 1886)
 September 16 – Percy Chapman Black, politician (born 1878)
 September 21 – William Duncan Herridge, politician and diplomat (born 1888)
 September 30 - Onésime Gagnon,  politician and the 20th Lieutenant Governor of Quebec (born 1888)
 October 15 – Peter Dickinson, architect (born 1925)
 October 22 – Harry Nixon, politician and 13th Premier of Ontario (born 1891)

Full date unknown
 Anne Wilkinson, poet (born 1910)

See also
 1961 in Canadian television
 List of Canadian films

References

 
Years of the 20th century in Canada